Kjøbenhavns Forstæders Sporveisselskab (literally "Copenhagen Suburban Tramway Company") was an operator of three tramways in Copenhagen, Denmark. The company was founded in 1872 and merged into De kjøbenhavnske Sporveje in 1898.

History
 
Kjøbenhavns Forstæders Sporveiiselskab was founded by O.V. Bruun after he had been granted a concession on the establishment and operation of a tram line between Tringlen and Gammel Kongevej on 5 August 1872. He subsequently founded  the Blegdamsvej Line  which opened on 12 April 1873 and was initially served by nine tram cars that operated with nine minute intervals.

The company obtained the concession on the Farimagsgade Line. It was inaugurated on 22 July 1883 and was initially served by eight one-storey tram cars that were operated with eight minute intervals.

The company's Nørregade Line, its third and last tram line, was inaugurated on 20 July 1884. It was served  by five one-storey tram cars with seven minute intervals.

O.V. Bruun died on 23 July 1884 and was succeeded by E. Lautrup. He had previously served as inspector at Frederiksberg Hospital. More tram cars were added on all three lines in the 1890s.

Kjøbenhavns Forstæders Sporveisselskab merged with four other tram companies under the name A/S De kjøbenhavnske Sporveje on 1 August 1898. E. Lautrup was CEO of the new company, a position he held until his death in 1902.

Depots
 Blegdamsvej 
 Øster Farimagsgade

Lines

References

External links

 Kjøbenhavns Forstæders Sporveisselskab
 Tramways in Denmark

Rail transport in Copenhagen
Danish companies established in 1872
1898 disestablishments in Denmark